Africa Hinterland was an overland travel company set up in the UK in the early 1980s to smuggle arms into South Africa for the military struggle against the apartheid system.  It was founded  by exiled members of the African National Congress and made over 40 trips into South Africa by truck, carrying up to a ton of weapons on each trip hidden in secret compartments welded under the truck seats.

The operation was never exposed at the time, and was revealed several years after the last trip had run. The story was told in the documentary film, "The Secret Safari" made in 2001, directed by Tom Zubrycki and produced by David Max Brown and Sally Browning.

Background 
The truck was designed by Rodney Wilkinson, who a few years earlier had planted two limpet mines at the Koeberg nuclear power station in South Africa, just a few weeks before he completed his contract there as the after-building designer. The mines were set to explode just before the facility was loaded with nuclear material, but the damage was significant. Rodney was never suspected. Under-cover and bored in London he came up with a simple, but ingenious design for an overland truck that could carry passengers and a ton of hidden weapons. ANC leader Joe Slovo showed the design to Mannie Brown, a businessman and ANC exile, and asked him to set up a travel company and recruit reliable drivers.

The Bedford truck was modified at a farm outside London by Rodney and Mannie's nephew and shipped to Kenya. The tourists were flown to Mombasa from the UK. For the first few trips the tourists were mainly from Europe and America, but it soon became apparent that the most hardy travelers were from New Zealand and Australia, so the Hinterland team quickly began to target their publicity to areas around Earl's Court in London, where there was a high population of Australians.

The drivers were mainly recruited from the British and Dutch Communist parties and were brave young men and women who knew exactly what they were doing, and that they would have to look after the paying tourists between Kenya and South Africa, as well as collecting the weapons in Lusaka, Zambia and driving the load safely to a camp site near Johannesburg or Cape Town. The most dangerous part of their journey would begin here when the drivers would unload the steel containers of weapons out from the secret compartments in the truck and into smaller passenger vehicles. These would be driven to drop off areas where unidentified operatives of the ANC would collect and further distribute or strategically bury the weapons.

The South African military knew that weapons were leaking into the country and put spies onto all sorts of transport that was crossing the border. Africa Hinterland was no exception, and came to their special attention because it was one of a handful of tour companies that was openly breaking international travel sanctions to South Africa. Nonetheless they sent over to London an experienced Australian special forces operative who had volunteered his services to them (to the South African Security services?). He bought his ticket and traveled on the second of the Africa Hinterland trips in late 1986 or early 1987. The very young and inexperienced English driver, Stuart Round suspected he had a spy among his passengers and reported as much to his handlers in the ANC, but the decision was taken to continue as normal. The cover of the tourists was so complete that the South African spy reported that the Africa Hinterland operation was 'clean' and after this close shave, the trips continued almost without hitch.

Many of the weapons were used as part of the ANC military campaign against the apartheid regime, but significant caches were dug up and handed over to the new government in 1995.  A closely guarded secret within the ranks of the ANC until 2001, is the fact that the Africa Hinterland operation continued to operate after Nelson Mandela's release in February 1990, and for three years after his speech in August 1990 when he announced the cessation of the movement of men and arms into South Africa. It would have been under Mandela's command that the Africa Hinterland operation was ordered to continue and relocate in 1990 from the United Kingdom to South Africa. The drivers, at that time from London from Amsterdam, opened an office in Johannesburg and ran trips with South African passengers paying for excursions to the Okavango and returning via Bulawayo, where the truck was loaded up with weapons. These trips took two weeks compared to the long haul six weeks from Kenya, and as long as the tourists could be found to fill the truck and provide the cover the trips continued until late 1993 when it was clear that elections would actually happen and the fighting between different factions was dying down.

Very few leaders in the ANC knew about the Africa Hinterland operation and the hidden weapons, but those that did know have said that it gave them some bargaining muscle during the negotiations process. Oliver Tambo and others such as Chris Hani and Mac Maharaj had also been planning Operation Vula, which ran until the early 1990s and aimed to also bring weapons and personnel into South Africa.

See also 
 South Africa under Apartheid

References 

 Sheree Russouw, "On display: The secret history of the struggle", Johannesburg News Agency, March 6, 2003

External links 
 The Secret Safari at IMDb

Arms trafficking
Apartheid in South Africa
South Africa–United Kingdom relations